Lyonetia photina is a moth in the  family Lyonetiidae. It is known from Australia.

They probably mine the leaves of their host plant.

External links
Australian Faunal Directory

Lyonetiidae